Amalie Milling (born 27 December 1999) is a Danish handball player who plays for København Håndbold and the Danish national team.

She also represented Denmark in the 2015 European Women's U-17 Handball Championship, were she received gold and in the 2016 Women's Youth World Handball Championship, placing Runners-up.

She made her debut on the Danish national team on 28 September 2018.

Individual awards 
 Best Goalkeeper of the EHF European Under-19 Championship: 2017

References

1999 births
Living people
Danish female handball players
People from Hørsholm Municipality
Sportspeople from the Capital Region of Denmark